James Hibberd (born 19 April 1981 in Southampton, Hampshire) was an English cricketer. He was a right-handed batsman and bowled medium-fast.

Hibberd made his debut for the Hampshire Cricket Board in the 38-County Cup during the 2000 season, playing his first match against Dorset. He played three matches during the competition, top-scoring with 24 runs.

Hibberd made a single List-A appearance for the Hampshire Cricket Board against the Kent Cricket Board during the 2001 Cheltenham & Gloucester Trophy. He did not bat or bowl in the match which, having been extended to two days after a wash-out on the first day, had to be settled by a bowl-out.

Hibberd made three appearances in the same competition for Wiltshire, his debut for the side coming in August 2002, against Hampshire Cricket Board. His final List-A match came against Kent in the 2005 Cheltenham & Gloucester Trophy. Hibberd took 7-97 against Cardiff University in his last match for Hampshire 1st XI also scoring 33 with the bat.

In four List A matches, he scored 27 runs in three innings, including an innings high of 26 runs in his first innings. He bowled 25 overs in List-A cricket, taking 7 wickets and conceding 80 runs, including a best bowling performance of 4-48 in his debut match.

External links
James Hibberd at Cricinfo
James Hibberd at CricketArchive 

1981 births
Living people
Cricketers from Southampton
English cricketers
Hampshire Cricket Board cricketers
Wiltshire cricketers